Tarana Burke (born September 12, 1973) is an American activist from The Bronx, New York, who started the MeToo movement. In 2006, Burke began using MeToo to help other women with similar experiences to stand up for themselves. Over a decade later, in 2017, #MeToo became a viral hashtag when Alyssa Milano and other women began using it to tweet about the Harvey Weinstein sexual abuse cases. The phrase and hashtag quickly developed into a broad-based, and eventually international movement.

Time named Burke, among a group of other prominent activists dubbed "the silence breakers", as the Time Person of the Year for 2017. Burke presents at public speaking events across the country and is currently Senior Director at Girls for Gender Equity in Brooklyn.

Early life and education 
Burke was born in The Bronx, New York, and raised in the area. She grew up in a low-income, working-class family in a housing project and was raped and sexually assaulted both as a child and a teenager. Her mother supported her recovery from these violent acts and encouraged her to be involved in the community. In her biography Burke states that these experiences inspired her to work to improve the lives of girls who undergo extreme hardships. As a teenager, she began improving the lives of young girls living in marginalized communities. 

Burke attended Alabama State University then transferred and graduated from Auburn University at Montgomery. During her time in college, she organized press conferences and protests regarding economic and racial justice.

Career 
An activist since 1989, Burke moved to Selma, Alabama, in the late 1990s after graduating college.

After working with survivors of sexual violence, Burke developed the nonprofit "Just Be" in 2003, which was an all-girls program for Black girls aged 12 to 18. In 2006, Burke founded the MeToo movement and began using the phrase "Me Too" to raise awareness of the pervasiveness of sexual abuse and assault in society.

In 2008, she moved to Philadelphia and worked at Art Sanctuary Philadelphia and other non-profits. She was a consultant for the 2014 Hollywood movie Selma, based on the 1965 Selma to Montgomery voting rights marches led by James Bevel, Hosea Williams,  Martin Luther King Jr. and John Lewis.

The phrase "Me Too" developed into a broader movement following the 2017 use of #MeToo as a hashtag after the Harvey Weinstein sexual abuse allegations. By mid-October 2017, Burke was notified by her friends that the MeToo hashtag was being used online. Burke decided to be in service and shape the movement to make it about "empowermental empathy". Time named Burke, among a group of other prominent female activists dubbed "the silence breakers", as the Time Person of the Year for 2017.

In 2018, she attended the 75th Golden Globe Awards as a guest of American actor Michelle Williams. Burke received the 2018 Prize for Courage from The Ridenhour Prizes, which is awarded to individuals who demonstrate courageous defense of the public interest and passionate commitment to social justice. 

Burke is currently Senior Director at Girls for Gender Equity. Burke organizes workshops to help improve policies at schools, workplaces, and places of worship, and focuses on helping victims not blame themselves for sexual violence. Burke attends public speaking events across the country. More recently, Burke and Mervyn Marcano, of Field/House Productions, inked a CBS Studios overall deal. Burke had two books published in 2021: You Are Your Best Thing: Vulnerability, Shame Resilience, and the Black Experience (co-authored with Brené Brown for Random House, April 2021) and Unbound: My Story of Liberation and the Birth of the Me Too Movement (Flatiron Books, September 2021).

Activism

Girls for Gender Equity 
Burke is the Senior Director of Girls for Gender Equity in Brooklyn, which strives to help young women of color increase their overall development through various programs and classes.

Just Be Inc. 
In 1997, Burke met a girl named Heaven in Alabama who told her about being sexually abused by her mother's boyfriend. She says she didn't know what to say, and never saw the girl again. She says she wished she had said "me too." Burke has said she came to believe girls needed "different attention" than their male peers. This and other incidents led Burke to found Just Be Inc., an organization that promotes the wellness of young female minorities aged 12–18. In 2006, she made a Myspace page. Just Be Inc. received its first grant in 2007.

MeToo movement 

In 2006, Burke founded the MeToo movement and began using the phrase "Me Too" to raise awareness of the pervasiveness of sexual abuse and assault in society.

The phrase "Me Too" developed into a broader movement following the 2017 use of #MeToo as a hashtag following the Harvey Weinstein sexual abuse allegations.  In October 2017, actress Alyssa Milano encouraged women to say "Me Too" if they've experienced sexual harassment or assault, and the hashtag became popular. Milano quickly acknowledged Burke's earlier use of the phrase on Twitter, writing "I was just made aware of an earlier #MeToo movement, and the origin story is equal parts heartbreaking and inspiring". Burke has been supportive of the #MeToo hashtag.

Time named Burke, among a group of other prominent activist women dubbed "the silence breakers", as the Time Person of the Year for 2017. Her speaking engagements have included Brown University in February 2018 and at Calvary Episcopal Church (Pittsburgh) about the roots of the movement. Harvard University also published a case study on Burke in 2020.

In 2021, Burke published a memoir describing the relationship of her activism to experience with leaders of the civil rights movement titled: Unbound: My Story of Liberation and the Birth of the Me Too Movement.

Honors and awards 
 2017: Time, Time Person of the Year
 2018 Time, 100 Most Influential People of 2018
 2018: The Ridenhour Prizes, The Ridenhour Prize for Courage}
 2018: SheKnows Media, the VOTY (Voices of the Year) Catalyst Award
 2019: Trailblazer Award winner
 2022: BBC 100 Women

References

External links 
 
 
 

Living people
American social activists
People from the Bronx
African-American activists
1973 births
Activists from New York City
21st-century African-American people
21st-century African-American women
20th-century African-American people
20th-century African-American women
BBC 100 Women